Georgi Kakalov (born 18 July 1984) is a Bulgarian former footballer.

Career
Kakalov started his career in home town Plovdiv, playing for the local team of Maritsa. The then 18-year-old subsequently went to Litex Lovech. For two years he stayed at Litex but only played in three games. In the 2003–04 season, Kakalov was loaned to Vidima-Rakovski Sevlievo, then to Belite orli. From January 2005 to June 2005 Kakalov played for Spartak Pleven.Since the start of season 2005–06 was playing for Botev Plovdiv

He moved to Belarusian side Dinamo Minsk in 2008. On 8 January 2009 he was loaned for 6 months to Cherno More Varna and then loaned from February 2010 to Olympiakos Nicosia.

On 21 June 2010, he signed with Liga I team Astra Ploieşti as a free agent.

In July 2017, Kakalov joined Third League club Borislav Parvomay.

International career
He is a former member of the Bulgaria U21 side. Kakalov made his debut for Bulgaria national football team on 26 March 2008 in the 2:1 home win against Finland.

References

External links

1984 births
Living people
Bulgarian footballers
Bulgaria international footballers
Footballers from Plovdiv
Association football forwards
PFC Litex Lovech players
PFC Vidima-Rakovski Sevlievo players
PFC Spartak Pleven players
Botev Plovdiv players
FC Dinamo Minsk players
PFC Cherno More Varna players
Olympiakos Nicosia players
FC Astra Giurgiu players
PFC Pirin Blagoevgrad players
FC Etar 1924 Veliko Tarnovo players
FC Haskovo players
FC Botev Vratsa players
FK Horizont Turnovo players
PFC Lokomotiv Mezdra players
First Professional Football League (Bulgaria) players
Second Professional Football League (Bulgaria) players
Liga I players
Bulgarian expatriate footballers
Bulgarian expatriate sportspeople in Cyprus
Bulgarian expatriate sportspeople in Romania
Bulgarian expatriate sportspeople in Greece
Bulgarian expatriate sportspeople in Turkey
Expatriate footballers in Belarus
Expatriate footballers in Cyprus
Expatriate footballers in Romania
Expatriate footballers in North Macedonia
Expatriate footballers in Greece
Expatriate footballers in Turkey
Bulgarian expatriate sportspeople in Belarus
Bulgarian expatriate sportspeople in North Macedonia
Panelefsiniakos F.C. players